Mt. Angel School District (91) is a public school district in Mt. Angel, Oregon, United States. Schools in the district include the John F. Kennedy High School, Mt. Angel Middle School, and St. Mary's Public School. Administrative headquarters are at 730 East Marquam Street in Mt. Angel. Troy Stoops is the district superintendent.

References

School districts in Oregon
Education in Marion County, Oregon
Mt. Angel, Oregon